Literariness is the organisation of language which through special linguistic and formal properties distinguishes literary texts from non-literary texts (Baldick 2008). The defining features of a literary work do not reside in extraliterary conditions such as history or sociocultural phenomena under which a literary text might have been created but in the form of the language that is used. Thus, literariness is defined as being the feature that makes a given work a literary work. It distinguishes a literary work from ordinary texts by using certain artistic devices such as metre, rhyme, and other patterns of sound and repetition.

History
The term ‘literariness’ was first introduced by the Russian Formalist Roman Jacobson in 1921. He declared in his work Modern Russian Poetry that ‘the object of literary science is not literature but literariness, i.e. what makes a given work a literary work’ (Das 2005, p. 78). Russian formalism preceded the Russian Revolution as it originated in the second decade of the 20th century and flourished in the 1920s. It  had its origin in two centres: the Moscow Linguistics Circle and the St. Petersburg based group OPOJAZ (the Society for the Study of Poetic Language) (Makaryk 2000, p. 53). The focus of their attention was on the analysis of the features that make up literary texts in opposition to the former traditional study of literature which focussed on studying literature in conjunction with other disciplines such as history, biography, sociology and psychology (Makaryk 2000, p. 53). It insisted that literary scholars should solely be concerned with the component parts of a literary text and should exclude all intuition or imagination. It emphasised that the focus resides on the literary creation itself rather than the author/reader or any other extrinsic systems (Erlich 1973, p. 628).

To Russian Formalists, and especially to Victor Shklovsky, literariness, or the distinction between literary and non-literary texts,  is accomplished through ‘defamiliarization’ (Ekegren 1999, p. 44). A main characteristic of literary texts is that they make the language unfamiliar to the reader and deviate from ordinary language. They have the capacity to defamiliarise our habitual perceptions of the real world and the capacity to estrange it (Ekegren 1999, p. 44). Shklovsky stated that the purpose of art is to disrupt the automatic response to things and give it a new and unforeseen perception (Makaryk 2000, p. 54). Defamiliarised language will draw attention to itself: as our perceptions are automatic, it will force the reader to notice the unfamiliar through a variety of different techniques i.e. wordplay, rhythm, figures of speech and so on (Lemon 1965, p. 5).

Another key term in defamiliarisation and literariness introduced by Shklovsky is the concept of ‘plot’. For Shklovsky, the plot is the most important feature of a narrative as he claims that there is a distinctive difference between ‘story’ and ‘plot’. The story of a narrative entails the normal temporal sequence of events whereas the plot is a distortion of the normal storyline and thus associated with defamiliarisation (Williams 2004, p. 5).

The idea of defamiliarisation was further explored by the Prague School Theory with one of the main scholars, Jan Mukarovsky, and by later developments in the theory of Roman Jakobson. Jan Mukarovsky postulates the idea that linguistic deviation, such as foregrounding, is the hallmark of poetic texts (Pilkington 2000, p. 16). He claimed that the use of  linguistic devices such as tone, metaphor, ambiguity, patterning and parallelism distinguish ordinary language from poetic language. In the 1960s, Jacobson introduced the poetic function of literary texts and further developed the idea that the use of certain linguistic choices draw attention to the language of texts. He placed poetic language at the centre of his inquiry and emphasized that phonetically and syntactically repeated linguistic elements distinguish literary from non-literary texts. He tried to define literariness by distinguishing between six functions of language: the emotive, referential, phatic, metalingual, conative and poetic function (Zwaan 1993, p. 7) . To Jacobson, the poetic function is the most important function as it mainly focuses on the message itself (Zwaan 1993, p. 7). The different linguistic devices in a piece of literary text initiate the reader to have a closer look at the happenings in the text which without linguistic distortion, might have been left unnoticed. Thus, Roman Jakobson emphasised that what makes a literary text is merely associated with the language as self-sufficient entity while reference to social life, history, or anything outside the language is irrelevant.

Literary and non-literary texts

Literary texts

Literary poems
Some examples of defamiliarisation in poetic literary texts are Shakespeare’s sonnet starting with ‘My mistresses eyes are nothing like the sun’ in which rhyme and metre supply a poetic framework or Dickinson’s I felt a funeral in my brain in which the strategic use of the words in the title already create a notion of new and unfamiliar (Pope 2002).

Literary novels
Two British eighteenth century writers were often cited as a reference for narrative literary texts by Russian Formalists i.e. Jonathan Swift’s Gulliver's Travels and Laurence Sterne’s The Life and Opinions of Tristram Shandy, Gentleman (Selden 1997, p. 33). In Gulliver’s Travels, the overt disproportion between the characters i.e. between Gulliver and the Lilliputians, is an example of defamiliarisation from the real world as it draws attention to the unusual size of the characters (Pope 2002, p. 90). In Tristram Shandy, familiar actions are defamiliarised by being slowed down i.e. the narration is overtly and playfully interrupted, slowed down or accelerated. Furthermore, there is a distortion of the storyline, as the narrative structure and plot patterns are highlighted by positioning chapter 18 and 19 after chapter 25 (Klarer 2004, p. 78). The same can be noticed in Marcel Proust’s Remembrance of Things Past in which he tells the entire novel retrospectively, from the past to the present (Ryan 2011, p. 2).

Non-literary texts
While in Russian Formalism and Prague structuralism literary texts were seen as the ones that use language in aesthetic and estranged ways, non-literary texts were those that used everyday language precisely and accurately. They consisted of everyday texts, such as newspaper or magazine articles, letters, brochures, advertisements, reports, or editorials.

Development of new theories on literariness

New theories
In the 1970s, some scholars moved away from the solely linguistic theory adopted by the Russian Formalists and started  acknowledging  the role of the reader to establish a theoretical discipline. Many of these scholars, who included Jonathan Culler, Stanley Fish, and Umberto Eco, stated that literariness cannot be defined solely on the basis of linguistic properties found within a text but that the reader is also a crucial factor in the construction of meaning (Zwaan 1993, p. 8).

They acknowledged the fact that foregrounding is a feature of poetry, however, claimed that language structures such as foregrounding can also be found in ordinary texts e.g. advertisement. Jakobson agrees that such poetic functions can be found in any text but argues that the dominance of those functions over other functions is what makes a text a poetic text (Pilkington 2000, p. 19). Although this justification was accepted by later scholars, Jakobson’s theory was still not perceived as a perfectly acceptable condition for the separation of  literary from ordinary texts. As a result, Culler and Fish emphasized that the crucial aspect of literariness is not the poetic construction of a text but the conventional expectations that are involved. Their main emphasis was on a reader-oriented theory which goes beyond a solely textual perception and focuses on the role of the reader in processing and interpreting a text. Fish argued that meaning and literariness are not textual properties but rely on interpretative constructions by the reader (Zwaan 1993). Readers are members of certain social communities in which certain conventions and patterns persist and in which they acquire certain interpretive strategies. (Zwaan 1993). He argued that a certain interpretation of a text will only occur because of the conventional strategies that determine the interpretive community.

Strong opposition to the Formalist theory has not only been voiced by reader-oriented theories but also by Marxist critics, speech act theory and new historicism. They all agreed that the view on a distinct definition between ordinary and literary texts should be rejected (Abrams 2009, p. 128).

Two views on literariness
Thus, the search for a definition of literariness has developed in two directions. The first direction is the Russian Formalist's approach which assumes that there is a difference between literary and ordinary texts  with features specific to literary language. The second approach rejects this assumption, as those linguistic features can be found in any other instance of language use. This approach moves the interest from the grammatical structures, syntax and semantics, to that of pragmatics which analyses the author's and the reader's view on the text (Nöth 1990, p. 350).

Modern theories on literariness
Nowadays, theorists disagree on the issue of what is understood by literariness. In the 1990s, a number of scholars reintroduced the model of formalism to define literariness. Theorists such as Van Dijk (1979) or Van Dijk and Kintsch (1983) focus on the cognitive aspects of meaning representation and say that literariness must seek a basis not in linguistic theory but in a cognitive pragmatic one. Zwaan (1993) claims that readers develop cognitive control systems for specific types of discourse which monitors the comprehension of literary texts. Yet other scholars think that a theory of literariness is merely impossible.

References 

Abrams, M. H. a. H., Geoffrey Galt. 2009. A Glossary of Literary Terms. 9th ed. Michael Rosenberg.

Baldick, C. 2008. The Oxford Dictionary of Literary Terms [Online]. Oxford University Press. Available at: http://www.oxfordreference.com/views/ENTRY.html?entry=t56.e661&srn=1&ssid=507492325#FIRSTHIT [Accessed: 6 December ].

Das, B. K. 2005. Twentieth Century Literary Criticism. Atlantic: New Delhi.

Ekegren, P. 1999. The Reading of Theoretical Texts: A Critique of Criticism in the Social Sciences. London: Routledge

Erlich, V. 1973. Russian Formalism. Journal of the History of Ideas 34(4), pp. 627–638

Klarer, M. 2004. An introduction to literary studies. London: Routledge, p. 78.

Lemon, L. T. a. R., Marion J. 1965. Russian Formalist Criticism: Four Essays. University of Nebraska.

Makaryk, I. R. 2000. Encyclopedia of contemporary literary theory: approaches, scholars, terms. Toronto Press: Canada.

Pilkington, A. 2000. Poetic Effects: A Relevance Theory Perspective. John Benjamin.

Pope, R. 2002. The English Studies Book: An Introduction to Language, Literature and Culture. 2nd ed. London: Routledge.

Ryan, M. 2011. An Introduction to Criticism: Literature / Film / Culture. Wiley-Blackwell.

Selden, R. e. a. 1997. A reader's guide to contemporary literary theory 4th ed. London : Prentice Hall/Harvester Wheatsheaf.

Williams, J. J. 2004. Theory and the Novel: Narrative Reflexivity in the British Tradition. Cambridge University Press: Cambridge.

Zwaan, R. A. 1993. Aspects of Literary Comprehension: A Cognitive Approach. John Benjamins.

Nöth, W. (1990) Handbook of Semiotics. Indiana University Press.

Miall, D. S. and Kuiken, D. (1994) Foregrounding, Defamiliarization, and Affect: Response  to Literary Stories. Poetics. Volume 22, pp. 389–40

Van  Dijk, T.A. (1979). Cognitive processing of  literary discourse. Poetics Today. Volume 1,  pp. 143–15

Van Dijk, T. A., & Kintsch, W. (1983). Strategies of discourse comprehension. New York: Academic Press.

Literary theory